George F. Cahill Jr. (July 7, 1927 – July 30, 2012) was an American scientist who significantly advanced the diabetes mellitus research of the 20th century. He focused on metabolic research, especially concerning human glucose metabolism in diabetic and normal conditions; he also investigated the effect of hunger and fasting on metabolic pathways and ketose processes. He was author and co-author of nearly 200 articles in scientific magazines and books.

Early life

George Cahill Jr. was born in New York City. He attended the Hotchkiss School and then completed a course of studies at the Yale University, graduating in 1949.  In 1953, he earned a medical doctoral degree at the Columbia College of Physicians and Surgeons.

Career 
Cahill started working as a medical assistant at the Biochemical Department at the Peter Bent Bringham Hospital (today: Brigham and Women’s Hospital) in Boston. 
He was also involved in research at the Albert Baird Hastings laboratory from 1955 until 1957 before he transferred to the Joslin's Diabetes Center in 1958, after another clinical year. There, he took the place of research director when Albert Renold returned to Europe 1962. Cahill held the position until 1978.
1962 he became active in the research at the Howard Hughes Medical Institute (HHMI), since 1972 as member of the advisory board and later as research director and finally vice president. He left the HHMI in 1990.
1970 he became a Harvard Medical School professor. Until 1990 he continued teaching classes, before he had been given emeritus status.
Since 1989 Cahill taught a biology course for non-biologists at the Dartmouth College.

Personal life 
Cahill married Sarah ("Sally") duPont († 2010) in 1949. They had four daughters and two sons.

Works (selection)

 Clinical and Climatological Association. Band 73, 1961, S. 22–29, . . .
 G. F. Cahill, O. E. Owen: Starvation and survival. In: Transactions of the American Clinical and Climatological Association. Band 79, 1968, S. 13–20, . . .
 O. E. Owen, P. Felig, A. P. Morgan, J. Wahren, G. F. Cahill: Liver and kidney metabolism during prolonged starvation. In: The Journal of clinical investigation. Band 48, No. 3, März 1969, S. 574–583, . . . .
 P. Felig, E. Marliss, O. E. Owen, G. F. Cahill: Blood glucose and gluconeogenesis in fasting man. In: Archives of internal medicine. Band 123, No. 3, März 1969, S. 293–298, . . (Review).
 G. F. Cahill: Starvation in man. In: The New England Journal of Medicine. Band 282, No. 12, März 1970, S. 668–675, . . . (Review).
 G. F. Cahill, T. T. Aoki: Starvation and body nitrogen. In: Transactions of the American Clinical and Climatological Association. Band 82, 1971, S. 43–51, . . . (Review).
 P. Felig, E. B. Marliss, G. F. Cahill: Metabolic response to human growth hormone during prolonged starvation. In: The Journal of clinical investigation. Band 50, No. 2, February 1971, S. 411–421, . . . .
 G. F. Cahill, T. T. Aoki, N. B. Ruderman: Ketosis. In: Transactions of the American Clinical and Climatological Association. Band 84, 1973, S. 184–202, . . .
 G. F. Cahill: Starvation in man. In: Clinics in endocrinology and metabolism. Band 5, No. 2, Juli 1976, S. 397–415, . . (Review).
 G. F. Cahill: Human evolution and insulin-dependent (IDD) and non-insulin dependent diabetes (NIDD). In: Metabolism: clinical and experimental. Band 28, No. 4 Suppl 1, April 1979, S. 389–393, . . (Review).
 G. F. Cahill: President’s address. Starvation. In: Transactions of the American Clinical and Climatological Association. Band 94, 1983, S. 1–21, . . . (Review).
 G. F. Cahill, R. L. Veech: Ketoacids? Good medicine? In: Transactions of the American Clinical and Climatological Association. Band 114, 2003, S. 149–161, . . . (Review).
 G. F. Cahill, R. L. Veech: Ketoacids? Good medicine? In: Transactions of the American Clinical and Climatological Association. Band 114, 2003, S. 149–161, . . . (Review).
 G. F. Cahill: Fuel Metabolism in Starvation. In: Annual Review of Nutrition. 26, 2006, S. 1–22, .

Awards (selection)

 Young Investigator Award of the Endocrine Society and the American Diabetes Association
 1963: Oppenheimer Award of the Endocrine Society
 1979: Gairdner Foundation International Award
 1980: member of the American Academy of Arts and Sciences

References

1927 births
2012 deaths
Fasting researchers
Hotchkiss School alumni
Yale University alumni
Columbia University Vagelos College of Physicians and Surgeons alumni
American scientists